Hessische Staatskanzlei (the Hessian State Chancellery) is located in Mitte, Wiesbaden – opposite Kochbrunnenplatz –, Hesse, Germany. The former Grand Hotel Rose is the seat of the government of the State of Hesse. The cabinet meetings of the state government also take place here. The Acting Head of the Hessian State Chancellery has been Axel Wintermeyer since August 31, 2010. 

The State Chancellery also houses the Hessian Minister for Federal and European Affairs, to which the Hessian State Representation in Berlin belongs.

Function 
In the State Chancellery, the main features of the policy of the state government are drawn up and the work between the ministries is coordinated. From this building, the execution of the resolutions of the Landtag of Hesse and the issuance of laws and legal ordinances are controlled, and state treaties and administrative agreements are prepared. It is also the official residence of the Minister president, Boris Rhein, who was elected to that office in May 2022.

History 
Until 2004, the State Chancellery was spread over several buildings in Wiesbaden, which directly bordered the Warmer Damm park. Shortly after the turn of the millennium, the state acquired the former Hotel Rose on Kranzplatz in order to refurbish it for the State Chancellery in accordance with historic preservation requirements. In the summer of 2004, a branch office of the Hessian State Statistical Office and the State Center for Political Education, both of which are departments of the State Chancellery, moved in. A total of 440 employees work in the representative building from the Wilhelminian period.

The previous building of the Grand Hotel Rose stood on Kranzplatz and separated it from Kochbrunnenplatz. It was not demolished until early 1913. Permission for the new building, which extended to Taunusstraße, was granted in 1896. The hotel had 200 lounges and bedrooms and 55 bathrooms. The large bathing establishment had its own inflow from the Kochbrunnen hot spring. In the courtyard there was a large indoor tennis court.

From 1940 to 1944 it was the meeting place of the Franco-German Armistice Commission. From 1945 to 1948, the American occupation forces used the building.

In 1959, after a costly renovation, it was again operated as a hotel, but with fewer beds. Instead, 75 apartments were rented to permanent guests. 

The building, which real estate entrepreneur  acquired in the early 1990s in order to turn it into a luxury hotel again, stood empty for years after the Schneider affair in 1994. After a sensational billion-euro bankruptcy in 1994, Schneider was arrested in 1995 and sentenced to six years and nine months in prison for fraud, loan fraud and forgery of documents. He was released on parole in 1999.

References

Buildings and structures in Wiesbaden
Tourist attractions in Wiesbaden
Government of Hesse
Organisations based in Wiesbaden